John Edward MacDonell was Past President of the Progressive Conservative Association of Nova Scotia, a lawyer and a political aide to several Canadian political figured.  He was the son of Dr. John MacDonell and Mrs. Antonia (Toni) (née Mazerolle) MacDonell and died February 17, 2023, at the age of 56.

References

External links
 http://thechronicleherald.ca/novascotia/1152106-law-firm-will-have-man-in-ottawa
 http://thechronicleherald.ca/novascotia/1134958-peter-mackay-adviser-macdonell-leaves-for-private-sector
https://macisaacs.ca/tribute/details/610/John-MacDonell/obituary.html

Living people
Year of birth missing (living people)
Canadian political consultants
Canadian people of Scottish descent
People from Antigonish County, Nova Scotia
Schulich School of Law alumni